Saturday Night Football (SNF) is a football television programme on Sky Sports which broadcast live football from the Premier League. The show was originally presented by David Jones alongside Jamie Redknapp, in front of a live studio audience. The show ran from the start of the 2013–14 season to the end of the 2015–16 season and from the 2019–20 season and is one of the three main Premier League programmes broadcast by Sky Sports at the time, alongside Super Sunday and Monday Night Football.

The show ended at the end of the 2015–16 season, ahead of the commencement of a new Premier League broadcasting deal between Sky Sports and BT Sport, which saw BT take over the rights to the 5:30 pm kick-offs which Saturday Night Football broadcast.

As of the start of the 2019–20 season, Sky Sports regained the rights for this time slot with Kelly Cates presenting from the ground of the game as opposed to the studio.

Original Format
The show began at 5:00 pm (4:45 pm during the 2014–15 season) with David Jones and Jamie Redknapp discussing the day's results and building up to the live game. The show involved the use of the Sky pad, also used on Monday Night Football, to analyse the match. The show also made use of the studio audience with questions from them at certain points of the show.

After the live match has concluded, a highlights programme followed at 8:00 pm presented by Sarah-Jane Mee. This show broadcast a full replay of the best match from the 3:00 pm kick-offs, while at 10:00 pm a match choice is broadcast allowing the viewer to watch replays of any of the day's matches via the red button, apart from the 12:45 pm kick-offs which BT had the rights to.

Current Format

The show starts at 5:00 p.m. with Kelly Cates hosting coverage from pitch-side at the ground alongside selected Sky Sports pundits and other guests. After the game concludes, usually the co-commentator comes down to join Kelly Cates and the punditry team for analysis of the match.

Once the coverage has concluded, Game of the Day is the following programme every week, on air at 8:30 p.m. with a full 90 minute re-run of the day’s selected 3:00 p.m. kick-off. Match Choice then follows at 10:00 p.m.  with a choice of highlights, via the red button of every Premier League game played that day, except from the game that BT Sport broadcast in the 12:30 p.m. kick-off slot.

References

Sky Sports
Sky UK original programming
2010s British sports television series
2020s British sports television series
2013 British television series debuts
British television series revived after cancellation
Premier League on television